Aspergillusenes are a group of chemical compounds first isolated from a strain of sea fan-derived fungus Aspergillus sydowii.  They are sesquiterpenes of the bisabolane-type.

A laboratory synthesis of aspergillusene B was reported in 2020.

References

Aspergillus
Sesquiterpenes